826NYC is a nonprofit organization located in Park Slope, Brooklyn. It provides free after-school tutoring, workshops, in-schools tutoring, help for English language learners, and assistance with student publications. Drawing from a volunteer base of over 2,000, which includes many teachers, writers and journalism professionals, 826NYC unites students with tutors.  It is a chapter of 826 National.


Facade

826NYC is located in a "secret lair" behind The Brooklyn Superhero Supply Company, a store similar in eccentricity to 826 Valencia’s storefront pirate shop, and which sells capes, grappling hooks, utility belts (new and vintage), masks, tights, deflector bracelets, bottles of chaos and anti-gravity, secret identity kits, and more.  Visitors to the store can try out capes for free in a cape-testing wind tunnel (essentially a series of fans on a pedestal).  The store sells new and back issues of Timothy McSweeney's Quarterly Concern, The Believer, Wholphin, and other McSweeney's publications. The Brooklyn Superhero Supply Co. also carries a complete stock of publications written and edited by students at 826NYC including Trapped: The Encyclopedia of Escape, Sonny Paine, and issues 1 and 2 of The 826NYC Review.  The store front is literally a front for the charitable organization, with all sales going to the organization.  The store employs volunteers.

The design of the store features many tongue-in-cheek signs and features, and the staff treat their products as real super-hero supplies, and visitors as real super-heroes.  The secret lair to the student learning and activity center lies behind a swinging bookcase.

Events 

826NYC is known for hosting culturally innovative fundraising events.  In August 2006, 826NYC was the starting point for the Revenge Of The Book Eaters Tour, which stopped in each of the six cities home to an 826 National center.  The NYC stop, at The Beacon Theatre, featured performances by Jon Stewart, David Byrne, Sufjan Stevens, Dave Eggers, Sarah Vowell, John Hodgman, Eric Bogosian, Jonathan Coulton, and John Roderick in an evening that promised once and for all to settle the debate: words or music–which is better?

Other 826NYC fundraising events have included 826NYC Art Show (curated by Marcel Dzama and David Zwirner Gallery), 826NYC Fashion Show/Spring 2006 Collection (featuring crimefighting-wear designed by Marc Jacobs, Zac Posen, Jack Spade, Behnaz Sarafpour, Rebecca Taylor, Kenneth Cole, and Benjamin Cho, modeled by The Daily Show correspondents Kathleen Hanna and Amy Sedaris), McSweeney's vs. They Might Be Giants (based on Issue #6 of McSweeneys, held at Lincoln Center), How I Learned To Read (Eric Bogosian, Bob Balaban, Cynthia Nixon, Justin Theroux, Sam Rockwell, Philip Seymour Hoffman, Martha Plimpton, and Kristen Johnston read their favorite classic children's stories).

See also
The Writer's Block
Chris Molnar

References

External links

826 National
Park Slope